IRGC University of Command and Staff is the staff college of the Islamic Revolutionary Guard Corps (IRGC), located in Tehran, Iran. Based on IRGC's military doctrine, the academy focuses on irregular military science on both operational and tactical levels and presents IRGC's Supreme War Course.

References 

Islamic Revolutionary Guard Corps
Universities in Tehran
Staff colleges
Military education and training in Iran